The EPAE Cup, known as the Greek League Cup, a now defunct football competition, took place only once, in the year 1989–90 season. AEK Athens is the only winner of the League Cup, beating Panionios (3–3 and 3–1 on penalties), Aris (5–2), Levadiakos (0–0 and 1–0) and Olympiacos (3–2 in the final at the Athens Olympic Stadium, on 2 June 1990).

Road to Final
In the 1989-90 EPAE Cup, the participants were the 18 teams of the 1989–90 Alpha Ethniki, while the qualifying matches and the final were single matches, except for the semi-finals, which were double. The event began in January and ended in June 1990.

First round

|}

Additional round

|}

Quarter-finals

|}

Semi-finals

|}

Final

External links
RSSSF

1990
1990
League Cup
National association football league cups
Football cup competitions in Greece
1989 establishments in Greece
1990 disestablishments in Greece
League Cup